Gangan may refer to:

 GanGan, Japanese title for Aggressors of Dark Kombat
 Gangan (drum), a West African drum
 Gangan, Northern Territory, also known as Gan Gan, a settlement in Arnhem Land, Australia
 Gangan, Togo, a village in Togo, West Africa

See also
 Gan Gan, a village in Argentina
 Gan Gan massacre, a massacre of Aboriginal Australians in 1911
 Gangan Comics, a manga imprint of Square Enix
 Gangan Verlag, an Austrian Australian publisher
 Gungan, fictional species from Star Wars Universe 

ja:ガンガン
de:Gangan Verlag